Morum alfi is a species of sea snail, a marine gastropod mollusk, in the family Harpidae.

Description
The length of the shell attains 44.1 mm.

Distribution
This species occurs in Vietnamese Exclusive Economic Zone.

References

alfi
Gastropods described in 2018